Chinese Taipei participated at the 2018 Summer Youth Olympics, in Buenos Aires, Argentina from 6 October to 18 October 2018.

Archery

Chinese Taipei qualified two athlete based on its performance at the 2017 World Archery Youth Championships.

Individual

Team

Athletics

Badminton

Chinese Taipei qualified two players based on the Badminton Junior World Rankings. 

Singles

Team

Beach handball

Canoeing

Chinese Taipei qualified one boat based on its performance at the 2018 World Qualification Event.

 Girls' K1 - 1 boat

Dancesport

Chinese Taipei qualified one dancer based on its performance at the 2018 World Youth Breaking Championship.

 B-Boys - KennyG

Fencing

Chinese Taipei qualified one athlete based on its performance at the 2018 Cadet World Championship.

 Boys' Foil - Chen Yi-tung

Golf

Individual

Team

Gymnastics

Artistic
Chinese Taipei qualified one gymnast based on its performance at the 2018 Asian Junior Championship.

 Boys' artistic individual all-around - 1 quota

Judo

Individual

Team

Modern pentathlon

Roller speed skating

Chinese Taipei qualified two roller skaters based on its performance at the 2018 Roller Speed Skating World Championship.

 Boys' combined speed event - Chang Chia-wei
 Girls' combined speed event - Wang Kuan-chih

Rowing

Chinese Taipei qualified one boat based on its performance at the 2018 Asian Youth Olympic Games Qualification Regatta.

 Girls' single sculls - 1 athlete

Sailing

Chinese Taipei qualified one boat based on its performance at the 2018 Singapore Open (Asian Techno 293+ Qualifiers).

 Girls' Techno 293+ - 1 boat

Shooting

Chinese Taipei qualified one sport shooter based on its performance at the 2017 Asian Championships.

 Girls' 10m Air Rifle - 1 quota

Team

Swimming

Table tennis

Chinese Taipei qualified two table tennis players based on its performance at the Asian Continental Qualifier.

 Boys' singles - Lin Yun-ju
 Girls' singles - Su Pei-ling

Taekwondo

Tennis

Singles

Doubles

Weightlifting

Chinese Taipei qualified a male weightlifter based on its performance at the 2017 World Youth Championships. They later qualified a female weightlifter based their performance at the 2018 Asian Youth Championships.

 Boys' events - 1 quota
 Girls' events - 1 quota

References

2018 in Taiwanese sport
Nations at the 2018 Summer Youth Olympics
Chinese Taipei at the Youth Olympics